Vitaliy Viktorovych Turynok (born 14 September 1973) is a Ukrainian entrepreneur and politician. He is a former Governor of Zaporizhzhia Oblast.

In 1997, he graduated from the Zaporizhzhia State Engineering Academy. Electronic engineer.

Turynok worked at the Donetsk Chemical and Metallurgical Plant.

He was the director of Afganets LLC.

Deputy Director for Commercial Affairs of Postulate LLC.

Turynok was chairman of the board of the Rivne House-Building Plant.

References

External links 
 
 

1973 births
Living people
People from Donetsk Oblast
Governors of Zaporizhzhia Oblast
Independent politicians in Ukraine
21st-century Ukrainian businesspeople
21st-century Ukrainian politicians